This is a list of the National Register of Historic Places listings in Tampa, Florida.

This is intended to be a complete list of the properties and districts on the National Register of Historic Places in Tampa, Florida. The locations of National Register properties and districts for which the latitude and longitude coordinates are included below, may be seen in a map.

There are 79 properties and districts listed on the National Register in the city, including 3 National Historic Landmarks. Two other sites were once listed, but have been removed. The 22 properties and districts in Hillsborough County outside Tampa are listed in National Register of Historic Places listings in Hillsborough County, Florida.

Current listings

|}

Former listings

|}

See also
 List of National Historic Landmarks in Florida
 National Register of Historic Places listings in Hillsborough County, Florida
 National Register of Historic Places listings in Florida
 List of Mediterranean Revival Style Buildings of Davis Islands

References

 
Tampa
Tampa, Florida